Bartosz Filipiak (born 27 February 1994) is a Polish professional volleyball player. He competed for Poland at the 2019 Nations League. At the professional club level, he plays for Ślepsk Malow Suwałki.

Honours

Universiade
 2019  Summer Universiade

Individual awards
 2020: Polish Championship – Best Scorer (460)   
 2020: Polish Championship – Best Spiker

References

External links
 
 Player profile at PlusLiga.pl 
 Player profile at Volleybox.net

1994 births
Living people
Sportspeople from Łódź Voivodeship
Polish men's volleyball players
Universiade medalists in volleyball
Universiade silver medalists for Poland
Medalists at the 2019 Summer Universiade
BKS Visła Bydgoszcz players
Trefl Gdańsk players
Skra Bełchatów players
LKPS Lublin players
Ślepsk Suwałki players
Opposite hitters